Atlantico is a French news website. Founded on 28 February 2011 amid much media attention, it quickly attracted notice for scoops related to scandals involving the Socialist politician and International Monetary Fund head, Dominique Strauss-Kahn.

History
The website is inspired by the American websites The Huffington Post and The Daily Beast. It characterises its editorial position as "[classical] liberal and independent", while other French media have associated it with the right wing of the French political spectrum, a label rejected by Atlantico.

As of 2011, the site does not charge for access and is financed through advertisements. Its staff of about ten journalists also includes Gilles Klein, Anita Hausser, Christian de Villeneuve and Yves Derai. Among its regular contributors are the writers Chantal Delsol, Paul-Marie Coûteaux, Gérard de Villiers, Guy Sorman and Tristane Banon.

References

External links
 Atlantico.fr

2011 establishments in France
French-language websites
Publications established in 2011
French news websites